Frits von der Lippe (1 June 1901 – 5 September 1988) was a Norwegian journalist and theater critic. He served as Director of  Riksteatret in Oslo from 1949–1968.

Biography
Von der Lippe    was born in Bergen, Norway. His parents were Jakob von der Lippe (1870–1954) and Hanna Castberg (1872–1926). His brother Jens von der Lippe (1911–1990) was a ceramist, non-fiction writer and educator. He grew up in  Kristiania (now Oslo) where he took his  examen artium in  1919. He worked  the next year as a teacher  at Boen near Kristiansand. He then started as a career in journalism. He was employed at Tidens Tegn from 1920–21 and then at Morgenposten where he was a  theater critic  until 1930.

From 1930 to 1949, he worked as Deputy Secretary for Gyldendal Norsk Forlag. During the Occupation of Norway by Nazi Germany, publishing director Harald Grieg was under arrest  from 1941-42. Von der Lippe attended to the interests of the publisher during that period.

In parallel with the publishing activities after World War II,  von der Lippe wrote theater reviews in a series of newspapers. He was the first Director of the Riksteatret  from 1949 to 1968. He was also chairman of the Norwegian Theater and Music Council from 1947–49 and was chairman of the board of the Norwegian National Academy of Theatre from 1953 to 1971. He was awarded the Arts Council Norway Honorary Award (Norsk kulturråds ærespris) in 1968 for his contributions to Norwegian culture.

Bibliography
Rundt land og strand. Ved Riksteatrets første milepel (1959)

References

1901 births
1988 deaths
Journalists from Bergen
Norwegian theatre directors
20th-century Norwegian writers
20th-century Norwegian journalists
Theatre people from Bergen